It's Your World is a studio album by American vocalist Gil Scott-Heron and keyboardist Brian Jackson, released in November 1976 by Arista Records. Recording sessions for the album took place in studio and live in July 1976 at Paul's Mall in Boston, Massachusetts, Electric Lady Studios in New York City, and American Star Studios in Merrifield, Virginia. Scott-Heron and Jackson recorded the album with the former's backing ensemble, The Midnight Band. It's Your World was originally released on vinyl and was later re-released in 2000 on compact disc by Scott-Heron's Rumal-Gia label.

Critical reception 
In a contemporary review, Mick Brown of Sounds gave the album 4 out of 5 stars and stated: "Gil Scott-Heron takes another step in carving out his singular niche as jazz musician/rhetorician extraordinaire – number one in a field of one". Lawrence Journal-World writer Marshall Fine commended the "fluid aggregation of musicians" and praised the album's "integrity, intelligence and an involving musical style that belies the often-bitter nature of their lyrics". Village Voice critic Robert Christgau said, "If anything proves how serious Scott-Heron has become, it's the infectious groove running through all four sides of this concert album".

In a retrospective review, Maurice Bottomley of PopMatters complimented the album's incorporation of "ballads, poetry, jazz solos, Latin breaks and a hip funkiness", stating "It is raw, passionate and powerful, and at all times the rhythmic pulse and the solo explorations complement the lyrical wizardry". Bottomley viewed that It's Your World features Scott-Heron, Jackson, and backing ensemble The Midnight Band "at their collective peak" and wrote that it "functions both as a document of a particular historical moment and as a fresh musical experience today". U.S. News & World Report hailed it a "masterpiece", complimenting its "mellow funk" and "heartbreaking sonic portraits [...] seething with indignation and sorrow". Boston Herald writer Brian Coleman perceived "an upbeat and compassionate side" to Scott-Heron on the album and cited it as "arguably Scott-Heron's most fully realized work, tempering his early-70s anger with soulful wisdom and uplifting words". Allmusic writer Hal Horowitz called the album "a moving listening experience" and commended its themes with respect to "its Centennial-centric time frame", writing that it "loses little of its impact... [T]hese tunes have lost none of their lyrical edge or incisiveness throughout the years". Horowitz cited it as "one of Gil Scott-Heron's best albums as well as a compelling musical time capsule ... proof of the artist's musical and lyrical acuity".

Track listing

Side A (Just Before Sundown)
"It's Your World" (lyrics and music: Brian Jackson) (3:52)
"Possum Slim" (lyrics and music: Gil Scott-Heron) (6:00)
"New York City" (lyrics and music: Gil Scott-Heron) (4:45)

Side B (Nightfall)
"17th Street" (lyrics: Gil Scott-Heron; music: Adenola (Eddie Knowles), Bilal Sunni-Ali, Brian Jackson) (5:45)
"Tomorrow's Trane" (lyrics: Gil Scott-Heron; music: Alice Coltrane) (7:20)
"Must Be Something" (lyrics: Gil Scott-Heron; music: Brian Jackson, Bob Adams, Danny Bowens) (5:20)

Side C (Late Evening)
"Home Is Where the Hatred Is" (lyrics and music: Gil Scott-Heron) (12:10)
"Bicentennial Blues" (words: Gil Scott-Heron) (8:40)

Side D (Midnight and Morning)
"The Bottle" (lyrics and music: Gil Scott-Heron) (13:30)
"Sharing" (lyrics: Gil Scott-Heron; music: Brian Jackson) (5:55)

Personnel
 Gil Scott-Heron – vocals, electric piano
 Brian Jackson – piano, electric piano, synthesizer, flute, vocals
 Danny Bowens – electric bass, vocals
 Victor Brown – vocals, (solo on "Sharing")
 Bilal Sunni Ali – tenor saxophone, flute
 Barnett Williams – congas, (solo on "The Bottle"), percussion
 Tony Duncanson – congas, bongos, timbales (solo on "The Bottle")
 Reggie Brisbane – drums (traps), percussion
 Delbert Taylor – trumpet
Technical
 Malcolm Cecil – remastering

References

External links
 It's Your World at Discogs

1976 albums
Albums produced by Perpis-Fall Music, Inc.
Albums recorded at Electric Lady Studios
Arista Records albums
Gil Scott-Heron albums